Mode 3 may refer to:
 Mode 3 (telephone), a method of line sharing in telephony
 Mode 3, a protocol for an electric vehicle charge cable for AC charging according to IEC 62196
 Mode III, a class of stone tools, the Mousterian industry
 Mode 3, a sociological term for the production of knowledge; see quadruple and quintuple innovation helix framework